Tutor.com is an online tutoring company founded in 1998 that connects students to tutors in online classrooms. The service offers on-demand and scheduled tutoring to students, from fourth grade through college. Users can connect with live tutors of more than 40 subjects online, including math, science, essay writing, foreign language and test prep. As of 2020, the company has over 3,000 tutors.

Company history
Tutor.com was founded in 1998 by George Cigale. In its early years, the company focused on partnerships with libraries across the United States, which would provide online tutoring to its clients. Tutor.com expanded into multiple markets, including universities, employee benefits, the United States Department of Defense, and additional direct consumer services.

In January 2013, InterActive Corp (IAC) announced the purchase of Tutor.com, for an undisclosed amount. In August 2014, IAC's former subsidiary and Tutor.com's former parent Match Group bought test-preparation service The Princeton Review and combined it with its Tutor.com educational business. In March 2017, Match Group sold The Princeton Review, along with Tutor.com, to ST Unitas, a Korean education company.

The company has been featured prominently in The Wall Street Journal, Forbes, The New York Times and CNN when discussing the increasing trend of on-demand tutoring and educational technology.

U.S. military contract
In 2008, Tutor.com was awarded a contract with the United States Marine Corps to provide Marine families access to the service.

Since 2008, the program expanded to various branches within the U.S. military. As of 2020, Tutor.com for U.S. Military Families is a program funded by the funded by the U.S. Department of Defense and Coast Guard Mutual Assistance. The program provides eligible military service members and their dependents free, 24-hour access to online tutoring through Tutor.com.

In January 2014, Tutor.com was selected by the Department of Defense to help the Advanced Distributed Learning Initiative (ADL) develop strategies to improve training programs at the DoD. Over 250,000 physics and algebra Tutor.com tutoring sessions will be analyzed for research.

Leadership
Tutor.com was founded by in 1998 by George Cigale, who served as CEO through 2013.

Mandy Ginsberg was CEO of The Princeton Review and Tutor.com from 2013 to 2015. She had previously been CEO of Match.com. Ginsberg often appeared in the press to discuss the increasing trend of online tutoring with services like Chegg Tutors (InstaEDU), e-Tutor, Bookmytrainings, and Sylvan Learning, and the issues that families face when it comes to homework and preparing for college. Notable appearances include The Today Show segment "What You Need to Know About Tutors" and Parenting.com's article "Key Signs Your Child May Need a Tutor."

Kate Eberle Walker was CEO of The Princeton Review, which encompassed its subsidiary Tutor.com, from 2015 to 2017. She was succeeded by Andrew (Andy) Feld from 2017 to 2018.

After the South Korean company ST Unitas acquired The Princeton Review in 2017, Sangje Lee became CEO of The Princeton Review in 2018.

Recognition
Tutor.com was awarded a Parents' Choice Award Gold Award in 2008; was named to Deloitte's Technology Fast 50 Program for the New York Region, in 2006 and 2007; was honored as one of the 25 Best Small Companies for Women 2007 by Working Mother; and ranked in the Inc. 5,000 list of the fastest growing private companies in America by Inc. magazine in 2007. In May 2014 Tutor.com was awarded a SIIA CODiE Award for Best Postsecondary Personalized Learning Solution. Tutor.com achieved Learning Tools Interoperability certification as a tool provider from IMS Global in 2014.

Tutor.com was listed as one of Mashable's top nine dependable online tutoring resources, in 2013.

References 

Online tutoring
Educational websites